Richard Harold Fink (born May 31, 1951) is an American businessman and academic. He is the former executive vice president of Koch Industries, the second largest privately held company in the U.S.

Education and academic career
Fink received a B.A. in economics from Rutgers University, an M.A. in economics from the University of California, Los Angeles, and a Ph.D. in economics from New York University. Between 1980 and 1986, Fink was on the economics faculty at George Mason University, where he was the founder and director of the Center for Market Processes, which later became the Mercatus Center. Under his leadership, during the 1980s, George Mason was a center of Austrian Economics.

Relationship with Charles Koch

In the late '70s, Richard Fink met Charles Koch to discuss founding a research center devoted to teaching Austrian economics thought at Rutgers. Fink met with Koch in Wichita and planned what became the Mercatus Center in 1999.

Koch Industries
Fink served as an executive vice president of Koch Industries, Inc. He was also chairman and CEO of Koch Companies Public Sector, LLC, which provides legal and government and public affairs services to Koch Industries and its affiliate. He was on the board of directors of Koch Industries Inc., Georgia-Pacific and Flint Hills Resources, LLC.

Koch Family Foundations
Fink was a member of the boards of directors and President of the Charles G. Koch Charitable Foundation and the Claude R. Lambe Charitable Foundation. He was also on the board of the Fred C. and Mary R. Koch Foundation.

Board memberships
Fink served on the board of trustees of the Democratic Leadership Council.

Fink co-founded Citizens for a Sound Economy, where he served as president, and co-founded the Citizens for a Sound Economy Foundation, which is now the Americans for Prosperity Foundation. 
He also sat on the board of the Institute for Humane Studies, and the Mercatus Center at George Mason University. He previously served on the Consumer Advisory Council of the Federal Reserve Board and the Commission on Privatization.

Fink was a member of the boards of directors of the Charles Koch Foundation, the Claude R. Lambe Charitable Foundation, the Fred C. and Mary R. Koch Foundation, the Institute for Humane Studies, the Market-Based Management Institute, and Americans for Prosperity Foundation.

References

External links
 Fink's bio at the Mercatus Center
 

1951 births
Living people
Rutgers University alumni
University of California, Los Angeles alumni
New York University alumni
George Mason University faculty
20th-century American businesspeople
People from New Jersey
Koch Industries
21st-century American businesspeople
Mercatus Center
New Jersey Democrats